The following is a list of Malayalam films released in the year 1999.

 1999
1999
Malayalam
 Mal
1999 in Indian cinema